Schefflera acuminata is a flowering plant in the family Araliaceae, endemic to Peru.

References

acuminata